Dragan Bogdanovski (18 September 1929, in Klečevce, Kingdom of Yugoslavia – 31 May 1998, in Fredericia, Denmark) was a Macedonian political emigrant, civil rights and anti-communist activist. He was a prominent Macedonian nationalist receiving large support from the Macedonian emigration around the world. The ideology and principles that he coined would later grow into the political fraction in Macedonia known as the Internal Macedonian Revolutionary Organization - Democratic Party for Macedonian National Unity that Bogdanovski co-founded.

References 

1929 births
1998 deaths
People from Kumanovo Municipality
VMRO-DPMNE politicians
Macedonian nationalists